Bia is a Neotropical genus of butterflies, named by Jacob Hübner in 1819. They are in the brush-footed butterfly family, Nymphalidae.

Species
Arranged alphabetically.
Bia actorion (Linnaeus, 1763)
Bia peruana Röber, 1904

References

Morphinae
Nymphalidae of South America
Nymphalidae genera
Taxa named by Jacob Hübner